The Northeast Divisional Board is a division of the United States GAA (USGAA) covering the Boston Metropolitan Area. It is the largest division of the USGAA, which in turn is affiliated to the Gaelic Athletic Association in Dublin, the governing body for Gaelic games (including Gaelic football, hurling, and camogie). The Northeast Divisional Board headquarters are at the Irish Cultural Center (ICC) in Canton, Massachusetts, which has hosted USGAA championships and tournaments combining the USGAA and the other two North American GAA affiliates, the New York GAA and the Canadian GAA.

Area 
The Irish Cultural Center covers a tract of land that includes two parking lots, four Gaelic Football/Hurling fields, a club house with a pub, snack bar, events hall, and meeting room, and a children's playground. The largest of the four fields is used for minor league football/hurling games for teams in the local area. A bridge used for entering the facility is also used for marriages.

Recent history 
In 2006 it hosted the inaugural Owen Treacy Cup, a game between a combined North American team, and the winners of the Tommy Murphy Cup (in this case, Louth). On the same weekend it hosted the Martin Donnelly cup, and the first ever instance of the Ulster Hurling final being played outside Ireland, (in this case New York and Antrim competed). In 2007 the ICC hosted the Continental Youth Championship, a tournament in with U-10,U-12,U-14,U16 and U-18 Gaelic Football/Hurling teams from New York, Philadelphia, and Chicago competing.

Club competitions 
 Boston Senior Football Championship
 Boston Senior Hurling Championship
 Intermediate Football Championship
 Junior Football Championship
 Junior Hurling Championship

External links 
 Official website of Boston GAA
 Official website of USGAA

References 

Gaelic football in Massachusetts
Gaelic games governing bodies in the United States
Hurling in Massachusetts
Irish-American culture in Boston
New England
North American GAA
Sports in Boston